Just a Closer Walk with Thee is an LP album of spiritual songs sung by Patti Page, released by Mercury Records in 1960 under catalog number MG-20573.

Track listing

References

Patti Page albums
Mercury Records albums
1960 albums
Gospel albums by American artists